Cyrtanthus elatus, the Scarborough lily, is a bulbous flowering plant which originates from the Cape Province of South Africa. Other common names are fire lily and George lily.

Cultivars of the Scarborough lily have flowers which may be bright red, orange, yellow, or occasionally pink or white. They are relatively easy to grow in a warm, sheltered, frost-free spot. Alternatively, they can be grown under glass in pots. They require either full sun or slight shade. They flower in late summer or early autumn.

The Latin specific epithet elatus means “tall”.

This plant has gained the Royal Horticultural Society’s Award of Garden Merit (confirmed 2017).

See also

 List of plants known as lily

References

External links
 The Encyclopedia of Houseplants
 information from NCSU

Amaryllidoideae